Michael Gruninger  is a Canadian computer scientist and Professor of Industrial Engineering at the University of Toronto, known for his work on Ontologies in information science.
particularly with the Process Specification Language, and in enterprise modelling on the TOVE Project with Mark S. Fox.

Biography 
Gruninger studied computer Science and received his BA in 1987 at the University of Alberta, and his MA in 1989 at the university, where in 2000 he also received his PhD with a thesis entitled "Logical foundations of shape-based object recognition."

In 1993 Gruninger started as researcher at the Enterprise Integration Laboratory of the University of Toronto, Department of Mechanical and Industrial Engineering.  From 2000 to 2005 he was researcher at the Institute for Systems Research at the University of Maryland, College Park and a guest researcher at the Manufacturing Systems Integration Division of the National Institute of Standards and Technology (NIST). Since 2005
he has been a Professor of Industrial Engineering at the University of Toronto, where he leads the Semantic Technologies Laboratory.

Gruninger's research interests are in the field of "the design and formal characterization of theories in mathematical logic and their application to problems in manufacturing and enterprise engineering."

Gruninger is President of the International Association of Ontology and its Applications (IAOA) and Editor-in-Chief of the Applied Ontology Journal.

Publications 
Gruninger authored and co-authored numerous publications in his fields of expertise. A selection:
 Grüninger, Michael, and Mark S. Fox. "Methodology for the Design and Evaluation of Ontologies." (1995).
 Uschold, Mike, and Michael Gruninger. "Ontologies: Principles, methods and applications." Knowledge engineering review 11.2 (1996): 93-136.
 Fox, Mark S., and Michael Gruninger. "Enterprise modeling." AI magazine 19.3 (1998): 109.
 Gruninger, Michael, and Jintae Lee. "ONTOLOGY." Communications of the ACM 45.2 (2002): 39.
 Uschold, Michael, and Michael Gruninger. "Ontologies and semantics for seamless connectivity." ACM SIGMod Record 33.4 (2004): 58-64.

References

External links 
 Michael Gruninger at Semantic Technologies Lab.

Living people
Canadian computer scientists
Information systems researchers
Enterprise modelling experts
University of Alberta alumni
University of Maryland, College Park faculty
Academic staff of the University of Toronto
Year of birth missing (living people)